Cardis Cardell Willis (August 3, 1937 – February 10, 2007), better known as Cardell Willis and often billed as C. Cardell Willis, was an influential Milwaukee comic. He was locally known mostly in the 1970s, 1980s, and 1990s.  He went by the name Cardell socially and professionally, but used his formal name legally.

Willis was born in 1937, either on April 20, or August 3. The discrepancy is due to the remoteness of his hometown of Forest, Mississippi, and the fact that births had to be reported in the capital of Jackson at the time. He was born to William and Pearlie Mae Willis.  He was the youngest of eight. His siblings included William, Joseph, Lilly Mae, and Geneva.

He was mentor to Will Durst before his eventual fame in San Francisco, and Dobie Maxwell, as well as Richard Halasz, and Chris Barnes, all of whom are natives to Milwaukee.

He eventually developed Alzheimers, which robbed him of his ability to tell the storied jokes he was known for.  He died on February 10, 2007, in a group home at age 69 after suffering two strokes.  He was buried at Graceland Cemetery in Milwaukee.

A tribute show occurred to honor Willis' contributions and generosity to his peers and community.  The MC was Dobie Maxwell, who called Willis his "comedy father". The tribute show was donation-supported, and the remaining proceeds were given to the Boy Scouts of America, in which Willis was a Scoutmaster and had received the Silver Beaver Award.

According to onmilwaukee.com, Mayor Barrett designated April 22, 2012, as Cardell Willis Day.

References

External links
Archives of Willis from jsonline.com

Dobie Maxwell's reaction to Willis' death

Article on onmilwaukee.com discussing tribute show

1937 births
2007 deaths
African-American male comedians
American male comedians
20th-century American comedians
People from Forest, Mississippi
People from Milwaukee
20th-century African-American people
21st-century African-American people